M. R. K. Panneerselvam is an Indian politician Tamil and Minister of Agriculture and Farmers Welfare of Government of Tamilnadu and he has been the Minister for Health in the state of Tamil Nadu during the period from 2006 to 2011 Minister for Backward Classes during 1996  He was born in Muttam and has a bachelor's degree in Law.( The Tamil Nadu Dr.Ambedkar Law University)

Panneerselvam has been elected to the Tamil Nadu Legislative Assembly on five occasions from the Kurinjipadi constituency as a candidate of the Dravida Munnetra Kazhagam party. These were in the elections of 1996, 2001, 2006, 2016 and 2021.

Agriculture Minister 

As promised in the DMK election manifesto, a separate Agriculture Budget for the state was presented on 14 August 2021. MRK Panneerselvam, the minister for agriculture and farmer’s welfare, presented the budget and said that it was in line with the views of farmers and experts, whose opinions were sought before preparing it.

Minister for Agriculture and Farmer’s Welfare MRK Pannerselvam began the presentation by dedicating the budget to those farmers who are protesting at New Delhi against the farm laws.

References 

1957 births
Living people
Dravida Munnetra Kazhagam politicians
State cabinet ministers of Tamil Nadu
Tamil Nadu MLAs 1996–2001
Tamil Nadu MLAs 2001–2006
Tamil Nadu MLAs 2006–2011
Tamil Nadu MLAs 2016–2021
Tamil Nadu MLAs 2021–2026